Sandrine Van Roy is a Belgian-Dutch actress and advocate for victims of sexual violence.

Born in Heerlen, Netherlands, daughter of two general practitioners, she moved to Paris at the age of 17. She worked as a model before turning to comedy.

Practising stand-up, she opened for Mathieu Madénian and Gad Elmaleh. She was involved in the launch of Funny Bones, an English language YouTube channel. She since appeared in supporting roles in two EuropaCorp productions.

In May 2018, during a period marked by the Harvey Weinstein case, she filed a complaint against Luc Besson for rape; Luc Besson's lawyer, Thierry Marembert, stated that the director "still denies the charges brought against him".

In April 2021, the Mail Online recognized that publishing three articles in 2018 and 2019 revealing Sand Van Roy’s name and complaint against Luc Besson were a breach of her privacy. They also recognized that she never mentioned being drugged. They "offered to pay compensation and legal costs, and apologized to her for the distress caused."

Activism 
In May  2019, she protested the Cannes Film Festival's Palme d'honneur being given to Alain Delon by walking the red carpet with a temporary tattoo that read "Stop violence against women".

In 2020, Van Roy became an ambassador of the foundation Stichting Cassandra, which defends the interests of victims of sexual and psychological violence.

Filmography 

 2016 : Virgin by Nath Dumont: Kira
 2017 : Valerian and the City of a Thousand Planets by Luc Besson
 2018 : Taxi 5 by Franck Gastambide: Sandy
 2018 : Genius Picasso: Florelle
 2019 : Indulgence by Sergio Fabio Ferrari: Amanda
 2020 : A (K)Night in Paris (short), by Franck Galiègue: Pamela Isley

References

External links

Dutch film actresses
Living people
Year of birth missing (living people)
People from Heerlen
21st-century Dutch actresses
Dutch women activists
Dutch activists
Dutch television actresses
Dutch expatriates in France